{{Taxobox
| image = 
| image_caption = 
| regnum = Animalia
| phylum = Arthropoda
| classis = Insecta
| ordo = Lepidoptera
| familia = Pyralidae
| genus = Hypsotropa
| species = H. sabuletella
| binomial = Hypsotropa sabuletella| binomial_authority = (Zeller, 1852)
| synonyms = Anerastia sabuletella Zeller, 1852
}}Hypsotropa sabuletella is a species of snout moth in the genus Hypsotropa''. It was described by Zeller in 1852, and is known from South Africa.

References

Endemic moths of South Africa
Moths described in 1852
Anerastiini